The Electric Lady Studio Guitar, commonly referred to as the Jimi Hendrix Statue, is a life-size bronze sculpture of Jimi Hendrix by Daryl Smith, located at the intersection of Broadway and Pine Street in the Capitol Hill neighborhood of Seattle, Washington, in the United States. The statue depicts Hendrix playing a Stratocaster. Visit Seattle, a private nonprofit marketing organization, includes the sculpture in its list of African American Heritage Sites.

The work was vandalized in 2013.

The sculpture is part of a collection of statues on Capitol Hill including Chuck Berry, Buddy Holly, and Elvis Presley. The guitars featured with the statues were part of an "alternative corporate art collection" formed by Michael J. Malone, founder of AEI Music Corporation (now known as DMX) and Hunters Capital. The statues are currently all owned and maintained by Hunters Capital.

References

External links

 Book III: Sidewalk Survey - City of Seattle (PDF)
 Jimi Hendrix Statue at Lonely Planet
 Jimi Hendrix Tour at SugarBuzz Magazine
 Seattle Neighborhoods: Capitol Hill, Part 2 -- Thumbnail History at HistoryLink.org, the free online encyclopedia of Washington State history
 Recognition for a rock icon: a park named for Hendrix? by Bob Young (May 18, 2006), The Seattle Times

1997 establishments in Washington (state)
1997 sculptures
Bronze sculptures in Washington (state)
Capitol Hill, Seattle
Cultural depictions of Jimi Hendrix
Outdoor sculptures in Seattle
Monuments and memorials in Seattle
Musical instruments in art
Sculptures of African Americans
Sculptures of men in Washington (state)
Statues in Seattle
Statues of musicians in the United States
Vandalized works of art in Washington (state)